Henk Kronenberg (29 September 1934 – 25 March 2020) was a Dutch Roman Catholic bishop.

Kronenberg was born in the Netherlands and was ordained to the priesthood in 1961. He served as bishop of the Roman Catholic Diocese of Bougainville, Papua New Guinea from 1999 to 2009.

Notes

1934 births
2020 deaths
20th-century Dutch Roman Catholic priests
21st-century Roman Catholic bishops in Papua New Guinea
Roman Catholic bishops of Bougainville